Okanagan—Revelstoke was a federal electoral district in British Columbia, Canada, that was represented in the House of Commons of Canada from 1953 to 1968.

This riding was created in 1952 from parts of Kamloops and  Yale ridings.

It was abolished in 1966 when it was redistributed into Kootenay West, Okanagan Boundary and Okanagan—Kootenay ridings.

Members of Parliament

Election results

See also 
 List of Canadian federal electoral districts
 Past Canadian electoral districts

External links
Riding history from the Library of Parliament

Former federal electoral districts of British Columbia